Les Jardins-de-Napierville (English: The Gardens of Napierville) is a regional county municipality (French: Municipalité régionale de comté (MRC)) in southwestern Quebec, Canada in the Montérégie region. Founded on January 1, 1982. Its seat is Napierville.

History 
The RCM was formed on January 1, 1982 by combining historic Napierville County with other municipalities.

Subdivisions
There are 11 subdivisions within the RCM:

Cities & Towns (1)
 Saint-Rémi

Municipalities (8)
 Napierville
 Saint-Bernard-de-Lacolle
 Saint-Cyprien-de-Napierville
 Saint-Édouard
 Saint-Jacques-le-Mineur
 Saint-Michel
 Saint-Patrice-de-Sherrington
 Sainte-Clotilde

Townships (1)
 Hemmingford

Villages (1)
 Hemmingford

Demographics

Language

Transportation

Access Routes
Highways and numbered routes that run through the municipality, including external routes that start or finish at the county border:

 Autoroutes
 

 Principal Highways
 None

 Secondary Highways
 
 
 
 
 
 

 External Routes

See also
 List of regional county municipalities and equivalent territories in Quebec

References

External links
 MRC Les Jardins-de-Napierville (French)

 
Census divisions of Quebec